The 2022 Dixie Vodka 400 was a NASCAR Cup Series race held on October 23, 2022, at Homestead-Miami Speedway in Homestead, Florida. Contested over 267 laps on the 1.5 mile (2.4 km) oval, it was the 34th race of the 2022 NASCAR Cup Series season, the eighth race of the Playoffs, and the second race of the Round of 8.

Report

Background

Homestead-Miami Speedway is a motor racing track located in Homestead, Florida. The track, which has several configurations, has promoted several series of racing, including NASCAR, the NTT IndyCar Series and the Grand-Am Rolex Sports Car Series

From 2002 to 2019, Homestead-Miami Speedway has hosted the final race of the season in all three of NASCAR's series: the NASCAR Cup Series, Xfinity Series and Camping World Truck Series.

John Hunter Nemechek replaced Bubba Wallace for this race, as Wallace was parked by NASCAR for intentional retaliatory collision against Kyle Larson the previous race that collected playoff contender Christopher Bell.

Entry list
 (R) denotes rookie driver.
 (i) denotes driver who is ineligible for series driver points.

Practice

Practice results

Qualifying

Qualifying results

Race

Stage Results

Stage One
Laps: 80

Stage Two
Laps: 80

Final Stage Results

Stage Three
Laps: 107

Race statistics
 Lead changes: 11 among 5 different drivers
 Cautions/Laps: 5 for 30 laps
 Red flags: 0
 Time of race: 3 hours, 5 minutes and 24 seconds
 Average speed:

Media

Television
NBC Sports covered the race on the television side. Rick Allen, Jeff Burton, Steve Letarte and Dale Earnhardt Jr. called the race from the broadcast booth. Dave Burns, Kim Coon and  Marty Snider handled the pit road duties from pit lane.

Radio
MRN had the radio call for the race, which was also simulcast on Sirius XM NASCAR Radio. Alex Hayden, Jeff Striegle, and former NASCAR crew chief Todd Gordon called the action of the race for MRN when the field raced down the front straightaway. Dave Moody covered the action for MRN in turns 1 & 2, and Mike Bagley had the call of the action from turns 3 & 4. Steve Post, Georgia Henneberry, Brienne Pedigo, and Jason Toy covered the action of the race for MRN on pit road.

Standings after the race

Drivers' Championship standings

Manufacturers' Championship standings

Note: Only the first 16 positions are included for the driver standings.

References

Dixie Vodka 400
Dixie Vodka 400
Dixie Vodka 400
NASCAR races at Homestead-Miami Speedway